Răchitiș may refer to several places in Romania:

 Răchitiș, a village in Ghimeș-Făget Commune, Bacău County
 Răchitiș, a village in Bilbor Commune, Harghita County
 Răchitiș, a tributary of the Olt in Covasna County
 Răchitiș (Tazlău), a tributary of the Tazlău in Bacău County

See also 
 Răchita (disambiguation)
 Răchiți
 Răchițele (disambiguation)
 Răchitova (disambiguation)
 Răchitoasa (disambiguation)
 Rickets